Paços may refer to the following places in Portugal:

 Paços (Melgaço), a civil parish in the municipality of Melgaço
 Paços (Sabrosa), a civil parish in the municipality of Sabrosa 
 Paços da Serra, a civil parish in the municipality of Gouveia
 Paços de Brandão, a civil parish in the municipality of Santa Maria da Feira
 Paços de Ferreira, a municipality in the district of Porto
 Paços de Gaiolo, a civil parish in the municipality of Marco de Canaveses
 Paços de Vilharigues, a civil parish in the municipality of Vouzela